Tau is a village in Strand municipality in Rogaland county, Norway. The village is located on the shore of the Horgefjorden, a branch of the main Boknafjorden. Strand Church is located in the village.

The village lies along the Norwegian National Road 13 highway, southwest of the small villages of Fiskå and Holta and northwest of the town of Jørpeland.

Name
The name might come from the Old Norse word taufr which means 'witchcraft', since there was an ancient sacrificial field here in the Iron Age.

Economy
Comrod Communications is the largest employer in Tau, mainly manufacturing antennas for military use. Electrocompaniet is also based here. The factory Tau Mølle AS is located in Tau, producing puffed oats. The factory is located in a white mill that was used to brew the Norwegian beer known as "Tou".

References

Villages in Rogaland
Strand, Norway